Lazović is a Serbian Orthodox surname with origins in the clan of Kuči, Montenegro, the founder was Vuk Ljevak who had come to the Sekularac region in Kuči to maintain the peace among the Kuči tribes. The Kuči and Vasojevići clans had a blood feud (krvna osveta) which resulted in emigration to Šumadija, Peć (Metohija) and Herzegovina. The family of 50 houses in Metohija stayed until the 1999 war and then left for Serbia proper or Montenegro.

Notable people

 Barbara Lazović (born 1988), Slovenian female handball player
 Danilo Lazović (1951–2006), Serbian actor
 Danko Lazović (born 1983), Serbian footballer
 Darko Lazović (born 1990), Serbian footballer
 Dejan Lazović (born 1990), water polo player
 Đorđe Lazović (born 1990), footballer
 Đorđe Lazović (born 1992), footballer
 Katarina Lazović (born 1999), Serbian female volleyball player
 Radomir Lazović (born 1980), politician and activist
 Suzana Lazović (born 1992), Montenegrin female handball player
 Tihana Lazović (born 1990), actress
 Vladimir Lazović (born 1954), Serbian writer
 Vuk Lazović (born 1988), Montenegrin handball player
 Olgivanna Lloyd Wright (born 1898), maiden name Lazovich, headed an iconic architectural fellowship

References

Montenegrin surnames
Serbian surnames